The Sabah Democratic Party (abbrev: PDS) was a political party based in Sabah, Malaysia. It was an ethnically-based party striving to voice the rights and advance the development of Kadazan-Dusun-Murut (KDM) populations of Sabah and the Orang Asli of Peninsular Malaysia.

History
PDS started as Sabah Democratic Party or Parti Demokratik Sabah which was founded by Bernard Dompok and other disgruntled leaders who split from United Sabah Party or Parti Bersatu Sabah (PBS) soon after the Sabah state election, 1994 to join the Barisan Nasional (BN) coalition. PBS had won a majority in the Sabah State Legislative Assembly, but the defections allowed BN to form government. Part of the enticement offered by BN to the defectors was the promise of a rotating Chief Ministers of Sabah post, which Dompok held from 1998 to 1999. 

PDS was renamed as United Pasokmomogun Kadazandusun Murut Organisation (UPKO) on 8 August 1999, taking the same UPKO acronym of the defunct original United Pasokmomogun Kadazan Organisation, which was formed and dissolved in the 1960s. The party was re-branded again as United Progressive People of Kinabalu Organisation while maintaining its original UPKO acronym and opening party membership to other races than KDM in 24 November 2019.

General election results

See also
 Politics of Malaysia
 List of political parties in Malaysia
 United Pasokmomogun Kadazan Organisation (UPKO) (Old)
 United Pasokmomogun Kadazandusun Murut Organisation (UPKO) (New)
 United Progressive People of Kinabalu Organisation (UPKO) (Re-branded)

References

External links
 Official website

Defunct political parties in Sabah
1994 establishments in Malaysia
1999 disestablishments in Malaysia
Political parties established in 1994
Political parties disestablished in 1999
Ethnic political parties
Indigenist political parties